Namlos is a municipality in the district of Reutte in the Austrian state of Tyrol.

Geography
Namlos lies in a side valley of the Lech.

References

Cities and towns in Reutte District